Battle Mountain High School is a secondary school in Lander County, Nevada. It was built in 1983, and continues to serve as Battle Mountain's primary high school today.

Athletics 
The athletics program at Battle Mountain is known as the Longhorns and are affiliated with the Nevada Interscholastic Activities Association.

Nevada Interscholastic Activities Association State Championships 
 Baseball - 1976, 1978, 1981, 1986, 2002
 Golf (Girls) - 2008
 Wrestling - 1988, 1989, 1994, 2001, 2002, 2003, 2004, 2005, 2006, 2007, 2008, 2010, 2013, 2014, 2015, 2016, 2017, 2018

References

External links 
 

Public high schools in Nevada
Schools in Lander County, Nevada
Educational institutions established in 1983
School buildings completed in 1983
1983 establishments in Nevada
1980s architecture in the United States